John Sandys (1550 or 1555 in Lancashire – 11 August 1586 executed at Gloucester) was an English Roman Catholic priest. He is a Catholic martyr, beatified in 1987, and is commemorated on 11 August.

Life
John Sandys was born in the Diocese of Chester, and studied at the University of Oxford, and Douai College.

He arrived at Reims 4 June 1583, and was ordained priest in the Holy Cross Chapel of Reims Cathedral by the Cardinal Archbishop, Louis de Guise. He was sent on the English mission 2 October 1584. 

He was executed at Gloucester in 1586. John Sandys was among the 85 martyrs of England and Wales beatified by Pope John Paul II on 22 November 1987.

See also
 Catholic Church in the United Kingdom
 Douai Martyrs

References

Attribution

1586 deaths
16th-century English Roman Catholic priests
English beatified people
16th-century venerated Christians
Eighty-five martyrs of England and Wales
Year of birth uncertain
Year of birth unknown
Clergy from Lancashire